The Thief (Spanish:El ladrón) is a 1947 Mexican comedy film directed by Julio Bracho and starring Luis Sandrini, Domingo Soler and Elsa Aguirre.

Plot summary

Cast
 Luis Sandrini as Plácido ópez  
 Domingo Soler as Licenciado Marcelo Gómez Sosa  
 Elsa Aguirre as Rosa 
 Consuelo Guerrero de Luna as Señora Gómez  
 Dolores Tinoco as Directora del orfanatorio  
 Diana Bordes as Hija 1a 
 Manuel Noriega as Viejito velador  
 Humberto Rodríguez as Nuñez, empleado incinerador 
 Angélica Rey as Hija 2a  
 Lala Gil Bustamante as Hija 3a  
 Argentina Casas as Cuatita 1a  
 Carolina Casas as Cuatita 2a

References

Bibliography 
 Joanne Hershfield & David Maciel. Mexico's Cinema: A Century of Film and Filmmakers. 1999.

External links 
 

1947 films
1947 comedy films
Mexican comedy films
1940s Spanish-language films
Films directed by Julio Bracho
Mexican black-and-white films
1940s Mexican films